New Zealand competed at the 2017 World Championships in Athletics in London, United Kingdom, from 4 to 13 August 2017. A total 12 athletes completed in 13 events.

Medallists

Results

Men
Track and road events

Field events

Women
Track and road events

Field events

References

Nations at the 2017 World Championships in Athletics
World Championships in Athletics
New Zealand at the World Championships in Athletics